The 2013 William & Mary Tribe football team represented The College of William & Mary in the 2013 NCAA Division I FCS football season. The Tribe were led by 34th year head coach Jimmye Laycock, and the team played their home games at Zable Stadium. They were a member of the Colonial Athletic Association. They finished the season 7–5, 4–4 in CAA play to finish in a three way tie for fifth place.

Schedule

Ranking movements

References

William and Mary
William & Mary Tribe football seasons
William and Mary Tribe football team